Great Southern Television (GSTV) is a television production company primarily based in Auckland, New Zealand. The company produces television for the domestic and international markets - including factual, light entertainment, drama and documentary.

It was founded on June 1, 2002 and owned by Philip Smith and Sir David Levene. It is now wholly owned by founder Philip Smith.

The company has worked with a host of broadcasters locally and internationally, including TVNZ, TV3, Prime New Zealand,  Maori Television Service (MTS), The History Channel, Channel 7 Australia, Channel 9 Australia; ABC Australia, Discovery Channel, National Geographic Channel and  BSkyB (UK). 

In 2016, the company announced that it is producing a Maori current affairs show for TV3.

The company also has offices in Sydney, Australia.

Productions

Drama
The Kick (2014) Telefeature
Agent Anna (2013-2014) Series 1-2
The Cult (2009) Series 1
Bogan Brothers (2009) Series 1
The Pretender (2007-2008) Series 1-2
Why Does Love? The Exponents Story. (2017)
Hillary. (2016)
NZ Wars - Ruapekapeka
Jonah (2019) Mini series

Comedy
The Unauthorised History of New Zealand (2006-2009) Series 1-4
The Millen Baird Show (2010) Series 1
Feedback (2010) Series 1
1000 Apologies (2008) Series 1
Eating Media Lunch (2003-2008) Series 1-8
Back of the Y (2001-2008) Series 1-3
The Spinoff 2018

Film
Honk If You’re Horny (2012)
Show of Hands (2008)
Apron Strings (2008)
Babylon (2012)

Documentary and current affairs
The Hui, 2016, 2017, 2018

Factual and reality series
Shearing Gang (2011-Current) Series 1-3
Coast New Zealand (2015) Series 1
Crayfishers (2015) Series 1
Coast Australia (2013-2014) Series 1-2
Drug Bust (2012-2013) Series 1-2
Rescue 1 (2009-2012) Series 1-4
The Claim Game (2011) Series 1
Danger Beach (2010-2011) Series 1-2
The Lion Man (2004-2007) Series 1-3
Loggers
Casketeers
Remarkable Vets
Truth Files
Real Escapes

References

External links 
 Great Southern Film and Television

Television production companies of New Zealand
Mass media in Auckland
New Zealand companies established in 2002
Mass media companies established in 2002
Film production companies of New Zealand